So Fresh: The Hits of Spring 2007 features 20 songs that were popular during spring 2007 in Australia, and it was released on 8 September 2007. The songs featured on the compilation have all charted on the ARIA Singles Chart.

It was the third highest selling compilation album in Australia in 2007.

Track listing

Charts

Certifications

References

So Fresh albums
2007 compilation albums
2007 in Australian music